And I Love You So is a 2015 Philippine melodrama television series directed by Onat Diaz, starring Julia Barretto, Miles Ocampo, Dimples Romana and Angel Aquino. The series premiered on ABS-CBN's Kapamilya Gold afternoon block and worldwide on The Filipino Channel from December 7, 2015 to March 11, 2016, replacing Walang Iwanan.

List of episodes
In the table below, the green numbers represent the highest ratings and the red numbers represent the lowest ratings.

References

External links
 

Lists of Philippine drama television series episodes